Monticello Township is a township in Jones County, Iowa.

History
Monticello Township was organized in 1847.

References

Populated places in Jones County, Iowa
Townships in Iowa